Puyeh (also Romanized as Pūyeh) is a village in Kalat-e Hay-ye Sharqi Rural District, in the Central District of Meyami County, Semnan Province, Iran. At the 2006 census, its population was 246, in 59 families.

References 

Populated places in Meyami County